IMSL (International Mathematics and Statistics Library) is a commercial collection of software libraries of numerical analysis functionality that are implemented in the computer programming languages C, Java, C#.NET, and Fortran. A Python interface is also available.

The IMSL Libraries were developed by Visual Numerics, which was acquired in 2009 by Rogue Wave Software, which was acquired in 2019 by Minneapolis, Minnesotabased application software developer Perforce.

Version history 
 
The first IMSL Library for the Fortran language was released in 1970, followed by a C-language version originally called C/Base in 1991, a Java-language version in 2002 and the C#-language version in 2004. 

Several recent product releases have involved making IMSL Library functions available from Python. These releases are Python wrappers to IMSL C Library functions (PyIMSL wrappers) and PyIMSL Studio, a prototyping and production application development environment based on Python and the IMSL C Library. The PyIMSL wrappers were first released in August 2008. PyIMSL Studio was introduced in February 2009. PyIMSL Studio is available for download at no charge for non-commercial use or for commercial evaluation.

Current versions:
IMSL C Library V 8.0 – November 2011
IMSL C# Library V 6.5.2 – November 2015 (end of life announced as end of 2020)
IMSL Fortran Library V 7.0 – October 2010
PyIMSL Studio V 1.5 – August 2009
PyIMSL wrappers V 1.5 – August 2009
JMSL Library V 6.1 – August 2010

Platform availability 
The IMSL Numerical Libraries are supported on various operating systems, hardware and compilers.
Operating system support includes Unix, Linux,  Mac OS and Microsoft Windows
Hardware support includes AMD, Intel, Apple Inc., Cray, Fujitsu, Hitachi, HP, IBM, NEC, SGI and Sun Microsystems
Compiler support includes Absoft, GCC, Intel, Microsoft, and Portland

See also 
List of numerical-analysis software
List of numerical libraries

References

External links 
Rogue Wave Software's IMSL Libraries page

Fortran libraries
Numerical libraries